Ridge View High School (commonly abbreviated as RVHS) is a comprehensive public high school in Columbia, South Carolina. It currently holds approximately 1700 students. It is one of five high schools in Richland School District 2 along Spring Valley High School, Blythewood High School, Westwood High School, and Richland Northeast High School. The principal for the 2022-2023 school year is Brenda Mack-Foxworth.

As of 2013, the size of the facility is 238,755 square feet, and the school is built on a 60-acre campus.

Demographics
Ridge View High School has an 85% minority enrollment percentage.  The school's ethnicity/racial category percentages are: African-American 79%, Caucasian 10%, Hispanic 6%, Asian 2%, Two or More Races 4%, Native Hawaiian/Pacific Islander 0.3%, and American Indian/Alaskan Native 0%.

Academics 
Ridge View has an average GPA of 3.2. Beginning in 2022, Ridge View became one of approximately 60 schools in the United States, and the only school in South Carolina, to pilot the AP African American Studies course.

Marching band
The Ridge View Marching Band was featured in the 2013 6abc Dunkin' Donuts Thanksgiving Day Parade in Philadelphia, Pennsylvania. The band has also placed 2nd at the 4A State Championships in 2014 and 2016.

Athletics 

The Blazer Boys Soccer Team won consecutive Lower State Championships in 2000 and 2001. The 2001 Boys Soccer Team climbed to number 1 in the nation during the season and finished the 2001 season ranked in the top 10 Nationally.

The Blazer Boys Track and Field Team won three consecutive state championships in 2004, 2005, and 2006. During those victories, they set state records in the 4x800 relay and the record for most points ever scored in the state meet.

The Blazer Boys basketball team won the 2017–2018 4A State Championship.  The Blazer Boys Basketball team repeated as State Champions in 2018–2019.

The Ridge View Girls Track team claimed the 2018 AAAA State Championship.

The Blazers football team is a consistent playoff contender.  The 1998 team reached the 4A Div 2 State Championship, losing to Marlboro County.  The 2007 team advanced to the semifinal round of the state playoffs, losing to the eventual state champion Clover.  The Blazer Football team has advanced to the third round of the playoffs two out of the last three seasons. In 2022, the football team was forced to forfeit all games on charges of recruiting. 

The Blazer Boys Cross Country Running team finished 2nd in the state in 2001, 2004, 2009, and 2010.  The team won the Region Championship in 2002, 2004, 2007, 2008, 2009, and 2010.

The Blazer Girls Cross Country Running team won the Region Championship in 2011 and 2012.

Ridge View established their boys lacrosse team in the fall of 2003 and in their first season as a varsity team posted a record of 17–2 in the regular season before falling in the state semifinals to Greenville in an 8–7 overtime defeat.

In popular culture

In February 2023, Ridge View High was featured on the television show America in Black. The segment focuses on the implementation of the new AP African American Studies course launched by College Board in 2022. The spotlight includes interviews from the course teacher, Daniel Soderstrom, and a senior student, in addition to excerpts from the class lesson on The Harlem Renaissance. The episode gained 1.5 million views on its first airing and 2.7 million more in online streaming views. CNN and CBS also interviewed Soderstrom and students at the school.

Notable alumni 

 Jarrell Brantley, basketball player, formely played for Utah Jazz
 Brian Quick, former professional football player for St. Louis Rams
 Dennis Daley, professional football player Tennessee Titans
 Chazwick Bundick, musician, Toro y Moi (born in 1986, graduated from USC)
 Darell Scott, former professional football player
 Jonny Weston, actor
 Jasmine Sanders, model

References

Public high schools in South Carolina
Educational institutions established in 1995
Schools in Columbia, South Carolina
Magnet schools in South Carolina
1995 establishments in South Carolina